Đinh Thanh Bình (born 19 March 1998) is a Vietnamese football player who plays as a forward in V.League 2, club  Công An Nhân Dân.

Honours

Club
Công An Nhân Dân
V.League 2: 2022

International
Vietnam U21
International U-21 Thanh Niên Newspaper Cup
 Runners-up :  : 2017

International career

Vietnam U-23

References 

1998 births
Living people
Vietnamese footballers
Association football forwards
Hoang Anh Gia Lai FC players
V.League 1 players